The Israeli national under-20 basketball team represents the country in various FIBA youth tournaments. It usually competes in the FIBA Europe Under-20 Championship, and used to compete in the now defunct FIBA Under-21 World Championship. This team was originally the Israeli Under-22 national team, until the FIBA Europe Under-22 Championship was changed into an Under-20 age tournament.

Roster for the 2019 FIBA Europe Under-20 Championship

|}
|valign="top" |
 Head Coach
 Ariel Beit-Halahmy
 Assistant Coaches
 Sharon Avrahami
 Yoav Shamir
 Legend
(C) Team captain
Club – describes lastclub on 13 July 2019
Age – describes ageon 13 July 2019
|}

Participation in FIBA competitions

FIBA Europe Under-20 Championship

FIBA Under-21 World Championship (defunct)

See also
Israel national basketball team

References

B
Men's national under-20 basketball teams